Clayton Mansfield (May 21, 1906 – January 9, 1945) was an American modern pentathlete and a colonel in the United States Army. He competed at the 1932 Summer Olympics. He graduated from United States Military Academy in 1928 and became an officer in the United States Army. He served during World War II and was killed in German-occupied Belgium during the last days of the Battle of the Bulge. He received the Silver Star.

References

External links

1906 births
1945 deaths
American male modern pentathletes
Olympic modern pentathletes of the United States
Modern pentathletes at the 1932 Summer Olympics
People from Norristown, Pennsylvania
Sportspeople from Pennsylvania
United States Army personnel killed in World War II
United States Army colonels
United States Military Academy alumni
Recipients of the Silver Star
Military personnel from Pennsylvania
20th-century American people